Josh Hammer (born February 12, 1989) is an American conservative political commentator, attorney, columnist, and legal scholar. He is a syndicated columnist and the opinion editor for Newsweek, where he also hosts The Josh Hammer Show.

Education 
Josh Hammer was born in Westchester County, New York to a Jewish family. He graduated from Duke University in 2011 with a Bachelor of Science degree in economics. After graduating, he worked in antitrust research. He later earned his Juris Doctor from the University of Chicago Law School in 2016. In law school, he was active in the Federalist Society and the Edmund Burke Society. He has also been a fellow with the Claremont Institute and the James Wilson Institute.

Career 
After graduating from law school, Hammer worked for sixteen months at the Houston office of Kirkland & Ellis LLP. He then clerked for Judge James C. Ho on the U.S. Court of Appeals for the Fifth Circuit. While establishing himself as an editor at The Daily Wire and contributor at TheBlaze, he also worked as of counsel at the First Liberty Institute.

Starting in 2020, Hammer joined Newsweek as opinion editor. He is also the host of The Josh Hammer Show, a Newsweek podcast. Beginning that same year, he joined Creators Syndicate as a syndicated columnist and became a research fellow at the pro-national conservatism Edmund Burke Foundation, where his scholarship "specializes in the Anglo-American jurisprudential tradition." His recent scholarship includes the article "Common Good Originalism," published in the Harvard Journal of Law and Public Policy, in which he attempts to theorize a "middle-ground position" and fusion of originalism and common good constitutionalism.
Hammer has also contributed to the University of St. Thomas Law Journal.

The Southern Poverty Law Center reported that the Newsweek opinion section under Hammer's tenure had "emerged as a hub for opinion pieces authored by radical right activists", noting its elevation of conspiracy theorists such as Jack Posobiec and Dinesh D'Souza, and its publication of conspiracy theories about COVID-19.

In December 2022, Hammer attended the annual gala for the New York Young Republican Club, along with noted far-right figures such as Posobiec, Steve Bannon, Marjorie Taylor Greene, and Peter Brimelow.

Conservative activism 
An outspoken conservative, Hammer is a vocal commentator on conservative political, legal, and cultural issues at various publications. Hammer is a contributor to programs on networks such as Fox News, Fox Business, Newsmax, and One America News Network.
Hammer volunteers as counsel and policy advisor to the Internet Accountability Project. 
Hammer is vocal about Jewish- and Zionist-related issues; he has debated Peter Beinart about the Israeli-Palestinian conflict and Alan Dershowitz about the 2023 Israeli judicial reform dispute.

Hammer was involved with Senator Ted Cruz's 2016 presidential campaign, and in February 2016 was mentioned on national TV during Cruz’s Iowa Caucuses victory speech. More recently, Hammer was invited to the Florida governor’s mansion to meet with Governor Ron DeSantis in January 2022. Hammer currently sits on the board of advisors of groups such as American Moment and the New York Young Republican Club.

Personal
In December 2022, Hammer got engaged to Shir Cohen. He lives in South Florida.

References

External links 

https://www.newsweek.com/authors/josh-hammer
https://www.creators.com/author/josh-hammer
https://podcasts.apple.com/us/podcast/the-josh-hammer-show/id1606834013
https://burke.foundation/people/josh-hammer/
https://www.yaf.org/speakers/josh-hammer/
https://www.tpusa.com/josh-hammer
https://fedsoc.org/contributors/josh-hammer

American political commentators
1989 births
Living people
People associated with Kirkland & Ellis
Federalist Society members
American columnists
Duke University alumni
University of Chicago Law School alumni
American Jews